Sticklepath is a village on Dartmoor, in the county of Devon, England. It gives its name to one of the most important geological faults in south-west England, thought to have originated during the Tertiary period and known variously as the Sticklepath Fault, Sticklepath Fault Zone, Lustleigh-Sticklepath Fault or Sticklepath-Lustleigh Fault.

Further reading

The Story of Sticklepath, Sticklepath Women's Institute
The Finch Foundry Trust and Sticklepath Museum of Rural Industry, R.A. Barron

External links

Villages in Devon
Dartmoor